The SP-73 is a highway in the southeastern part of the state of São Paulo in Brazil.  The highway is known as the Lix da Cunha which begins with the SP-330 in Campinas all the way to SP-75 in Indaiatuba.

References

Highways in São Paulo (state)